Samegua District is one of six districts of the province Mariscal Nieto in Peru.

History 
Samegua District was created by Law 9940 (8 November 1894).

Authorities

Mayors 
 2011-2014: Carmen Gloria Zeballos Eyzaguirre 
 2007-2010: Renso Milthon Florencio Quiroz Vargas.

Festivities 
 Saint Isidro
 Immaculate Conception

See also 
 Administrative divisions of Peru

References

External links 
 INEI Peru